Artistic gymnastics at the 2002 West Asian Games was held at Yarmouk Hall, Kuwait City, Kuwait from 10 April 2002 to 12 April 2002.

It had a men's only programme containing 8 events. A total of 6 nations (Iran, Syria, Kuwait, Saudi Arabia, Jordan and Yemen) participated.

Medalists

Medal table

References

Official website

External links
Olympic Council of Asia - 2002 West Asian Games

2002 West Asian Games
West Asian Games
2002